Radical 85 or radical water meaning "water" is a Kangxi radical; one of 35 of the 214 that are composed of 4 strokes. Its left-hand form, is closely related to Radical 15,  bīng (also known as 两点水 liǎngdiǎnshuǐ), meaning "ice", from which it differs by the addition of just one stroke.

In the Kangxi Dictionary, there are 1,595 characters (out of 40,000) to be found under this radical.

In the Chinese wuxing ("Five Phases"), 水 represents the element Water. In Taoist cosmology, 水 (Water) is the nature component of the bagua diagram  kǎn.

Evolution

Derived characters

Literature 

Leyi Li: “Tracing the Roots of Chinese Characters: 500 Cases”. Beijing 1993,  tai

References

External links 

Unihan Database - U+6C34
Full list of characters with radical 85

085
077